Niebüll is a railway station serving the town of Niebüll in the state of Schleswig-Holstein in Northern Germany. The station lies on the Marsh Railway and the train services are operated by Deutsche Bahn and Nord-Ostsee-Bahn.

Train services
The station is served by the following services:
intercity service (IC26) Westerland - Niebüll - Hamburg - Uelzen - Hannover - Göttingen
intercity service (IC27) Westerland - Niebüll - Hamburg - Berlin - Dresden
intercity service (IC30) Westerland - Niebüll - Hamburg - Osnabrück - Dortmund - Düsseldorf - Köln - Stuttgart
intercity service (IC30) Westerland - Niebüll - Hamburg - Osnabrück - Dortmund - Düsseldorf - Köln - Frankfurt
regional express (Nord-Ostsee-Bahn) Westerland - Niebüll - Husum - Heide - Itzehoe - Elmshorn - Hamburg
regional service (Nord-Ostsee-Bahn) Westerland - Niebüll (- Husum)
regional service (Norddeutsche Eisenbahngesellschaft Niebüll, NEG) Niebüll – Dagebüll Mole
regional service (Arriva and NEG) Niebüll – Tønder – Esbjerg

Gallery

References

External links
Deutsche Bahn website
Nord-Ostsee-Bahn website
NEG website

Railway stations in Schleswig-Holstein
Railway stations in Germany opened in 1887